Harvinder Singh  (born 23 December 1977, Amritsar, Punjab, India) is an  Indian cricketer who played in three Tests and 16 One Day International (ODI) matches from 1997 to 2001.

Harvinder made his debut in ODI cricket for India against Pakistan during the 1997 Sahara Cup in Toronto. In 2020, he became an Indian national selector.

References

1977 births
India One Day International cricketers
India Test cricketers
North Zone cricketers
Central Zone cricketers
Railways cricketers
Punjab, India cricketers
Living people
Cricketers from Amritsar